Lingwood Meadows is a  biological Site of Special Scientific Interest east of Earl Stonham in Suffolk.

These ancient meadows are one of the few surviving examples of unimproved grassland in the county. They have diverse flora, and twenty grass species have been recorded with red fescue and Yorkshire fog dominant. Fifty-five other species include the nationally scarce sulphur clover.

The site is private land with no public access.

References

Sites of Special Scientific Interest in Suffolk